Harold Edward Hofmann (July 19, 1932 – November 16, 2013) was an American politician and 23-year Mayor of Lawndale, California.

Born in Montebello, California, Hofmann lived in the same house where he was raised. He first ran for Lawndale City Council in 1976 out of frustration with local government. He wasn't elected to the council until April 1980. Hofmann won re-election in 1984. He was first elected as mayor in April 1990, running on a platform of accountability among City Hall workers and improving the city's appearance. In a city without term limits and running unopposed in most elections, Hofmann was Lawndale's mayor until his death in 2013.

Before his political career, Hofmann served in the United States Army. At the age of 23, he owned a utility contracting business. He was married for over 60 years until his death. He and wife Doris had three children. Having lived with three stents in his heart, a pacemaker and two artificial hips, Hofmann died of natural causes at the age of 81 on November 16, 2013.

References

Mayors of places in California
California city council members
1932 births
2013 deaths
Lawndale, California
People from Montebello, California
Politicians from Greater Los Angeles
United States Army soldiers